Paweł Szokaluk (born 2 January 1991) is a former Polish footballer who played as a goalkeeper. He retired from professional football in 2014 having last played for Lechia Gdańsk.

Career

Club career
After playing the majority of his career in the lower leagues, Szokaluk made a surprise move to Lechia in 2014, becoming the third choice goalkeeper. At the end of the season Szokaluk was released from the club. 

At the age of 23, and having failed to make any real impact on a competitive starting place for any team he played for, he retired from professional football in 2014 following his release from Lechia. 

After his retirement from football Szokaluk created the company PaMaMi, a company which manufactures and sells hats and scarves.

References

1991 births
Living people
Lechia Gdańsk players
Lechia Gdańsk II players
Siarka Tarnobrzeg players
Chełmianka Chełm players
Polish footballers
Association football goalkeepers